Andrey Anatolyevich Ryabov (born 29 December 1969) is a Russian professional association football coach and a former player.

Club career
He played two seasons in the Russian Premier League for FC Okean Nakhodka.

External links

1969 births
People from Artyom, Russia
Living people
Soviet footballers
Russian footballers
Association football midfielders
FC Okean Nakhodka players
FC Saturn Ramenskoye players
FC Dynamo Stavropol players
FC Metallurg Lipetsk players
FC Luch Vladivostok players
Russian Premier League players
Russian football managers
FC Chita players
Sportspeople from Primorsky Krai